Kathleen Petyarre (born Kweyetwemp Petyarre; c. 1940 – 24 November 2018) was an Australian Aboriginal artist. Her art refers directly to her country and her Dreamings. Petyarre's paintings have occasionally been compared to the works of American Abstract Expressionists Jackson Pollock and Mark Rothko, and even to those of J.M.W. Turner. She has won several awards and is considered one of the "most collectable artists in Australia". Her works are in great demand at auctions. Petyarre died on 24 November 2018, in Alice Springs, Australia.

Background 
Kathleen Petyarre was born at Atnangkere, an important water soakage for Aboriginal people on the western boundary of Utopia Station, 240 km (150 miles) north-east of Alice Springs in Australia's Northern Territory. She belonged to the Alyawarre/Eastern Anmatyerre clan and spoke Eastern Anmatyerre, with English as her second language. Petyarre was the niece of the influential Aboriginal artist Emily Kame Kngwarreye and had several sisters who are also well-known artists in their own right, among them Gloria, Violet, Myrtle and Jeanna Petyarre. Kathleen, with her daughter Margaret and her sisters, settled at Iylenty (Mosquito Bore) at Utopia Station, near her birthplace.

Petyarre was introduced to the batik medium at a hippy commune on a visit to Wollongong, New South Wales, and began making her own batik in 1977 with the support and encouragement of the linguist and adult education instructor Jenny Green. Petyarre continued to produce batiks with other women at Utopia until the late 1980s, when, prompted by allergies to the chemicals they were using, she began developing her signature style painting with acrylic on canvas.

Style 
Petyarre's technique consisted of layering very fine dots of thin acrylic paint onto the canvas, evoking the Aboriginal custom of ceremonial body painting, to carefully construct abstract landscapes that reveal a remarkable depth when viewed up close. The dots are used to represent, among other things, flowers and spinifex, or animated clouds of sand, hail or even bush seeds. Meanwhile, various shapes and colours are used to depict geographical features such as sand-hills, watercourses and rockholes. Her imagery has been described as "simultaneously macro- and microcosmic".

Most of Petyarre's paintings detail the journeys of her Dreaming Ancestor, Arnkerrth, the Old Woman Mountain Devil, and are indicative of the Aborigines' traditional land navigation skills. She adopted an aerial view typical of her region's artworks to reconstruct memorised landscapes and express her Dreamings as "a barely tangible, shadowy palimpsest, overwritten, as it were, by the surface colours and movement". She described her paintings as "like looking down on my country during the hot time, when the country changes colour... I love to make the painting like it’s moving, travelling, but it’s still our body painting, still our ceremony."

From about 2003–2004, Petyarre's style became bolder, with clusters of larger dots and stronger lines alongside the very fine textures for which the artist is known. While this style was decried in some quarters as being less refined, it has also been hailed as a logical artistic development towards a more powerful and dramatic mode of expression, "perhaps more abstract, certainly more modern in its technicality and presentation" (text Gallerie Australis, Adelaide).

Reputation 
Petyarre's rise to international recognition began at the Aboriginal Art from Utopia exhibition at the Gallery Gabrielle Pizzi, Melbourne, on 31 October 1989. Despite remaining a relative unknown for the years to follow, she surprised the art world in 1996 by selling out her first solo exhibition, Kathleen Petyarre: Storm in Atnangkere Country, at Melbourne's Alcaston House Gallery.

Her considerable reputation as one of Australia's most original indigenous artists was confirmed by her regular inclusion in exhibitions at renowned international museums and galleries. A book about her art, Genius of Place, was published in 2001 in conjunction with a solo exhibition of her works at the Museum of Contemporary Art Australia in Sydney, and her paintings can be found in public and private collections all over the world. Her work was selected, along with just a handful of Aboriginal artists, for inclusion in the permanent collection of the Musée du Quai Branly in Paris.

Controversy 
In 1996, Petyarre was the Overall Winner of the 13th Telstra National Aboriginal & Torres Strait Islander Art Awards. Controversy arose in 1997 when Petyarre's estranged partner of ten years, Ray Beamish, claimed that he had been a major contributor to the winning painting, Storm in Atnangkere Country II, which currently hangs at the Museum and Art Gallery of the Northern Territory in Darwin.

This controversy, which shook the Aboriginal art market at the time, brought attention to the communal nature of art production in her culture and resulted in a much stricter emphasis being put on the documentation of authorship in Aboriginal paintings.

Petyarre’s name was eventually cleared and she retained her award. She went on to criticise Beamish for appropriating “her birthright” (her Dreaming) in his own paintings.

Awards 
 1996 Overall Winner of the Telstra 13th National Aboriginal & Torres Strait Islander Art Award, Darwin, NT, Australia
 1997 Overall Winner of the Visy Board Art Prize, the Barossa Vintage Festival Art Show, Nurioopta SA, Australia
 1998 Finalist, Seppelt Contemporary Art Awards 1998 – Museum of Contemporary Art Australia, Sydney, Australia
 1998 Winner, People's Choice Award, Seppelt Contemporary Art Awards 1998, Museum of Contemporary Art Australia, Sydney, NSW, Australia

Exhibitions

Solo exhibitions 
2008 Kathleen Petyarre, Metro 5 Gallery, Melbourne, Australia
2004 Old Woman alex award , Coo-ee Aboriginal Art Gallery, Sydney, Australia
2003 Ilyenty – Mosquito Bore, Recent Paintings, Alcaston Gallery, Melbourne, Australia
2001 Genius of Place: The Work of Kathleen Petyarre, Museum of Contemporary Art Australia, Sydney, Australia
2000 Landscape, Truth and Beauty – Recent Paintings by Kathleen Petyarre, Alcaston Gallery, Melbourne, Australia
1999 Recent Painting by Kathleen Petyarre, Coo-ee Aboriginal Art Gallery, Mary Place Gallery, Sydney, Australia
1998 Arnkerrthe – My Dreaming, Alcaston House Gallery, Melbourne Australia
1996 Kathleen Petyarre: Storm in Aknangkerre Country, Alcaston House Gallery, Melbourne, Australia

Selected group exhibitions

Major collections 
{{columns-list|colwidth=30em|
 Royal Collection of HM Queen Elizabeth II
 Metropolitan Museum of Art, New York, USA
 Musée des Confluences, Lyon, France
 Musée du quai Branly, Paris, France
 AAMU Museum voor hedendaagse Aboriginal kunst (Museum for Contemporary Aboriginal Art), Utrecht, The Netherlands
 National Gallery of Australia, Canberra, Australia
 National Gallery of Victoria, Melbourne, Australia
 Art Gallery of South Australia, Adelaide, Australia
 Museum and Art Gallery of the Northern Territory, Darwin, Australia
 Aboriginal and Torres Strait Islander Commission (ATSIC) Collection, Australia
 Edith Cowan University, Perth Australia
 Flinders University Art Museum, Adelaide, Australia
 Royal Palace Museum, Ubud, Bali, Indonesia
 Kluge-Ruhe Aboriginal Art Collection, University of Virginia, USA
 Peabody Museum of Archaeology and Ethnology, Harvard University, Massachusetts, USA
 Riddock Regional Art Gallery, Mount Gambier, Australia
 Essl Collection, Vienna, Austria
 BHP Billiton Collection, Melbourne, Australia
 Holmes à Court Collection, Perth, Australia
 The Kelton Foundation, Los Angeles, California, USA
 Kerry Stokes Collection, Perth, Australia
 Levi-Kaplan Collection, Seattle, Washington, USA
 University of South Australia, Adelaide, Australia
 Adelaide Festival Centre Trust Collection, Adelaide, Australia
 Seattle Art Museum, Seattle, Washington, USA (permanent loan)
 Art Gallery of Western Australia, Perth, Australia (permanent loan)
 Biebuyck Family Collection, Boston, Massachusetts

Notes

Further reading

External links 
The Australian Indigenous Art Market top 100 – Profile of Kathleen Petyarre
Art Collector magazine – Profile of Kathleen Petyarre
Delmore Gallery – Profile of Kathleen Petyarre
Artlink magazine – Review of Genius of Place: The Work of Kathleen Petyarre

1940s births
2018 deaths
People from Alice Springs
Artists from the Northern Territory
Australian Aboriginal artists
Australian women painters
20th-century Australian women artists
20th-century Australian painters
21st-century Australian women artists
21st-century Australian painters